Kouassi is a surname. Notable people with the surname include:

 Blaise Kouassi (footballer, born 1974), former Côte d'Ivoire football defender
 Blaise Kouassi (footballer, born 1983), Ivorian footballer
Desmond N'Ze Kouassi (or Desmond N'Ze) (born 1989), Ghanaian footballer
Euphrasie Kouassi Yao (born 1964), Ivorian politician 
Gervais Lombe Yao Kouassi known as Gervinho (born 1987), Ivorian footballer
Marcus N'Ze Kouassi known as Marcus N'Ze (born 1987), Ghanaian footballer
Martial Yao Kouassi (or Martial Yao) (born 1989), Ivorian footballer 
Venceslas Kouassi (born 1981), Ivorian-born Burkinabé footballer
Victor Kouassi (born 1971), Ivorian rugby union player
Xavier Kouassi (born 1989), Swiss footballer